Tahar Ben Hassine Mansouri (born 9 January 1965 in Fouchana, Tunis) is a retired Tunisian marathon runner.

Achievements

External links

sports-reference

1965 births
Living people
Tunisian male long-distance runners
Athletes (track and field) at the 1996 Summer Olympics
Athletes (track and field) at the 2000 Summer Olympics
Olympic athletes of Tunisia
People from Ben Arous Governorate
Tunisian male marathon runners
Athletes (track and field) at the 1993 Mediterranean Games
Mediterranean Games competitors for Tunisia
20th-century Tunisian people